The uMuziwabantu Local Municipality council consists of twenty-one members elected by mixed-member proportional representation. Eleven councillors are elected by first-past-the-post voting in ten wards, while the remaining ten are chosen from party lists so that the total number of party representatives is proportional to the number of votes received. In the election of 3 August 2016 the African National Congress (ANC) won a majority of fourteen seats on the council.

Results 
The following table shows the composition of the council after past elections.

December 2000 election

The following table shows the results of the 2000 election.

March 2006 election

The following table shows the results of the 2006 election.

May 2011 election

The following table shows the results of the 2011 election.

August 2016 election

The following table shows the results of the 2016 election.

November 2021 election

The following table shows the results of the 2021 election.

By-elections from November 2021
The following by-elections were held to fill vacant ward seats in the period since the election in November 2021.

Most of ward 11 consists of the town of Harding, which was severely affected by the unrest in July 2021. A new ward, it was won by Sheikh Mondli Ncane from Al Jama-ah (AJ). An ANC coalition saw Ncane elected deputy-mayor. In June 2022, Ncane was ousted as deputy mayor, and replaced by a candidate from ANC coalition partner Abantu Batho Congress (ABC). Ncane quit his party, standing as a candidate for the Sizwe Ummah Nation (SUN) in the by-election. The seat was won by the Inkatha Freedom Party (IFP), which increased its share from 6% to 53%. Ncane got 31%, while the candidate from his previous party, AJ, got 1%.

References

uMuziwabantu
Elections in KwaZulu-Natal
Ugu District Municipality